Cazaux may refer to:

Cazaux
Cazaux Air Base
Cazaux-d'Anglès
Cazaux-Debat
Cazaux-Fréchet-Anéran-Camors
Cazaux-Layrisse
Cazaux-Savès
Cazaux-Villecomtal
Cabanac-Cazaux
Étang de Cazaux et de Sanguinet
Pierre Cazaux
Ray Cazaux
Sainte-Aurence-Cazaux